St. Louis Blues is a 1958 American film broadly based on the life of W. C. Handy. It stars jazz and blues greats Nat "King" Cole, Pearl Bailey, Cab Calloway, Ella Fitzgerald, Eartha Kitt, and Barney Bigard, as well as gospel singer Mahalia Jackson and actress Ruby Dee. The film's soundtrack uses over ten of Handy's songs, including the title song. In conjunction with the film, Cole recorded an album of W. C. Handy compositions, arranged by Nelson Riddle, and Fitzgerald incorporated "St. Louis Blues" into her concert repertoire.

Cast
 Nat King Cole as W.C. Handy
 Eartha Kitt as Gogo Germaine
 Cab Calloway as Blade
 Ella Fitzgerald as herself
 Mahalia Jackson as Bessie May
 Ruby Dee as Elizabeth
 Juano Hernandez as Rev. Charles Handy
 Teddy Buckner as Musician
 Barney Bigard as Musician
 George Callender as Musician
 Lee Young as Musician
 George Washington as Musician
 Billy Preston as Will Handy as a boy
 Pearl Bailey as Aunt Hagar
 Jester Hairston as Choir Master/Singer

Release
The film had its world premiere on April 10, 1958, at the Fox Theatre in St. Louis, Missouri, less than two weeks after Handy's death.

References

External links

1958 films
1958 drama films
1950s musical drama films
American musical drama films
American black-and-white films
African-American musical films
Jazz films
Biographical films about musicians
Musical films based on actual events
Paramount Pictures films
Cultural depictions of jazz musicians
1950s American films